The King Albert Medal was a Belgian medal established by royal decree on 7 April 1919 and awarded to both Belgians and foreigners who were exceptionally meritorious in promoting, organising or administering humanitarian and charitable work that assisted Belgians in need during the First World War.

Description
The King Albert Medal is a 35mm in diameter circular bronze medal.  Its obverse bears a 25mm in diameter central medallion bearing the left profile of King Albert I with the inscription in French or in Dutch "ALBERT KING OF THE BELGIANS" surrounded by a 5mm wide laurel wreath along the entire medal circumference.  On the reverse of the central medallion, the relief inscription on four lines in French or in Dutch "IN TESTIMONY OF NATIONAL RECOGNITION" with the years "1914-1918" at the bottom.

The medal is suspended by a ring through a suspension loop from a 38mm wide dark red silk moiré ribbon bearing a single 3mm wide longitudinal central stripe in the national colours of Belgium (1mm red, 1mm yellow and 1mm black).  The ribbon bore two such stripes if the recipients distinguished themselves in the covert resupply of occupied Belgium.

Notable recipients (partial list)
The individuals listed below were awarded the King Albert Medal:
Major General Doctor Antoine Depage
Major General Baron Edouard Empain
Cavalry Major General Baron Louis de Moor
Lieutenant General Doctor Paul Derache
Louis Dewis
Lieutenant General Doctor Edmond François Durré
Count Gaston Errembault de Dudzeele
Count Edmond Carton de Wiart
Edmond Rubbens
Léonce du Castillon
René Gérard
Edmond Ronse
Vicount Paul van Iseghem
Count Pierre de Liedekerke
Percy H Webb

See also

 List of Orders, Decorations and Medals of the Kingdom of Belgium

References

Other sources
 Quinot H., 1950, Recueil illustré des décorations belges et congolaises, 4e Edition. (Hasselt)
 Cornet R., 1982, Recueil des dispositions légales et réglementaires régissant les ordres nationaux belges. 2e Ed. N.pl.,  (Brussels)
 Borné A.C., 1985, Distinctions honorifiques de la Belgique, 1830-1985 (Brussels)

External links
Bibliothèque royale de Belgique (In French)
Les Ordres Nationaux Belges (In French)
ARS MORIENDI Notables from Belgian history (In French and Dutch)

Civil awards and decorations of Belgium
Awards established in 1919
1919 establishments in Belgium